Connor Carrick (born April 13, 1994) is an American professional ice hockey defenseman who currently plays under contract to the Boston Bruins of the National Hockey League (NHL). He was selected by the Washington Capitals in the fifth round (137th overall) of the 2012 NHL Entry Draft.

Playing career

Junior
Connor started playing AAA hockey in Chicago with the Chicago Fury, who subsequently retired his sweater number. He played there a season before getting drafted into the OHL by the Guelph Storm in the 11th round, 212th overall. The next two years, Carrick played with the US National Team Development Program, playing with the U-17 team the first year and the U-18 team the second year. That year, during his second season with the US National Team Development Program, he was traded from the Guelph Storm (for whom he chose not to play) to the Plymouth Whalers in exchange for a sixth-round pick and a pair of third-round picks.

During the 2012 NHL Entry Draft, the Washington Capitals selected Carrick in the fifth round, 137th overall. He chose to play the 2012–13 season in the OHL, where he played 68 games with the Whalers, recording 12 goals and 32 assists, for a total of 44 points, as well as 18 points in the post-season, while only playing in 15 games. He also led Plymouth in assists during the post-season with 16.

Carrick won a gold medal with Team USA at the 2013 IIHF World U18 Championship.

Washington Capitals
On September 23, 2013, the Capitals signed Carrick to a three-year, entry-level contract. On October 3, Carrick scored his first career NHL goal in a 5-4 win over the Calgary Flames. He split the season between the Capitals and their American Hockey League (AHL) affiliate, the Hershey Bears.

Toronto Maple Leafs

On February 28, 2016, Carrick, Brooks Laich and a 2016 second-round pick were traded to the Toronto Maple Leafs in exchange for Daniel Winnik and a 2016 fifth-round pick. He played in 16 games with the Maple Leafs to close out the season, recording four points. Carrick led the 2016 Calder Cup playoffs in scoring with 18 points in 15 games (including one five point performance). However, he and the Maple Leafs' AHL affiliate, the Toronto Marlies, were eliminated in Eastern Conference Finals by the Bears.

On July 22, 2016, the Maple Leafs re-signed Carrick to a two-year contract extension. He joined the Maple Leafs full-time for the 2016-17 season, appearing in 67 games.

On June 20, 2018, Carrick signed a one-year, $1.3 million contract extension with the Maple Leafs.

Dallas Stars
On October 1, 2018, the Maple Leafs placed Carrick on waivers. Later that day, he was traded to the Dallas Stars in exchange for a 2019 conditional seventh-round pick. In his debut for the Stars on October 4, he recorded two assists in a 3-0 win over the Arizona Coyotes. On October 28, Carrick was placed on injured reserve with a foot injury. He returned to the Stars' lineup on December 31 in a 3-2 loss to the Montreal Canadiens. On January 19, the Stars sent Carrick to their AHL affiliate, the Texas Stars on a conditioning loan. He skated in four games for Texas before returning to Dallas on January 27.

New Jersey Devils
On February 23, 2019, Carrick, along with a 2019 third-round pick, were traded to the New Jersey Devils in exchange for Ben Lovejoy. He skated in 20 games for the Devils to conclude the season.

On July 16, 2019, the Devils re-signed Carrick to a two-year, $3 million contract extension.

Seattle Kraken
On August 4, 2021, Carrick was signed as a free agent to a one-year, two-way $800K contract with expansion club, the Seattle Kraken. After attending training camp, Carrick was re-assigned to the Charlotte Checkers of the AHL.

Boston Bruins
As a free agent from the Kraken, Carrick joined the Boston Bruins organization, in signing a one-year, two-way contract on July 13, 2022.

Personal life
Carrick has two brothers, Hunter and Blake, who also play hockey. Blake plays Division 3 hockey for Trinity College, while Hunter is committed to play at Penn State University.

In the summer of 2018, Carrick married his fiancée Lexi Solofra.

Career statistics

Regular season and playoffs

International

Awards and honors

References

External links 
 

1994 births
Living people
American men's ice hockey defensemen
Binghamton Devils players
Charlotte Checkers (2010–) players
Dallas Stars players
Hershey Bears players
Sportspeople from Cook County, Illinois
Ice hockey players from Illinois
People from Orland Park, Illinois
New Jersey Devils players
Plymouth Whalers players
Providence Bruins players
Texas Stars players
Toronto Maple Leafs players
Toronto Marlies players
USA Hockey National Team Development Program players
Washington Capitals draft picks
Washington Capitals players